Rambahadur Limbu,  (born 8 July 1939) is a Nepalese Gurkha recipient of the Victoria Cross, the highest award for gallantry in the face of the enemy that can be awarded to British and Commonwealth forces. Rambahadur Limbu belongs to the Begha Clan of Limbu people of Nepal. Limbu was born in Chyangthapu village, Tehrathum, in East Nepal, and now lives in Damak. He is one of only five living recipients of the VC.

Military career

Victoria Cross
Limbu was 26 years old, and was a lance corporal in the 2nd Battalion, 10th Princess Mary's Own Gurkha Rifles, British Army during the Indonesian Confrontation when, on 21 November 1965 in Sarawak, Borneo, Lance Corporal Rambahadur Limbu was in an advance party of 16 Gurkhas when they encountered about 30 Indonesians holding a position on the top of a jungle-covered hill. The lance-corporal went forward with two men, but when they were only 10 yards from the enemy machine-gun position, the sentry opened fire on them, whereupon Limbu rushed forward and killed him with a grenade. The remaining enemy combatants then opened fire on the small party, wounding the two men with the lance corporal who, under heavy fire, made three journeys into the open, two to drag his comrades to safety and one to retrieve their Bren gun, with which he charged down and killed many of the enemy.

Extracts from citation

Later career
His original Victoria Cross was stolen, along with all his other possessions, while he was asleep during a train journey in India to his native Nepal in 1967. It has never been found, and he was issued with a replacement.

He reached the rank of captain, as a Queen's Gurkha Officer (QGO), and was appointed Member of the Royal Victorian Order (MVO) in 1984 for his service as Queen's Gurkha Orderly Officer.

In the media
Limbu was interviewed for the 2006 television docudrama Victoria Cross Heroes which also included archive footage and dramatisations of his actions.

Medal entitlement
Captain Rambahadur Limbu is entitled to the following medals;

List of Captain Rambahadur Limbu's Medals

See also
 List of Brigade of Gurkhas recipients of the Victoria Cross

References

External links
The Jungle War – Borneo, Brunei and Sarawak (including background to VC action)
 

1939 births
Living people
Nepalese recipients of the Victoria Cross
Royal Gurkha Rifles officers
Royal Gurkha Rifles soldiers
Members of the Royal Victorian Order
British Army recipients of the Victoria Cross
Limbu people
People from Panchthar District
British Army personnel of the Indonesia–Malaysia confrontation
British Army personnel of the Malayan Emergency